Adrian Robert James Pettigrew (born 12 November 1986) is an English former professional footballer who played as a central defender in the Football League for Brentford, Rotherham United and Wycombe Wanderers. A product of the Chelsea academy, he dropped into non-League football after his release in 2008.

Club career

Chelsea 
A central defender, Pettigrew began his career in the Chelsea academy and turned professional in March 2005. Despite captaining the reserve team during the 2005–06 season, Pettigrew failed to win a call into a first team squad before his release in May 2007.

Wycombe Wanderers (loan) 
In August 2006, Pettigrew was set to join League Two club Wycombe Wanderers on loan, but the deal was put on hold due to injury. He finally joined the club on 5 March 2007, on loan until the end of the 2006–07 season, as cover for the injured Mike Williamson. Pettigrew made just one appearance for the Chairboys, with a start in a 1–0 defeat to Bristol Rovers on 27 March and he was substituted for Chris Palmer at half time. The loan was ended early on 17 April.

Brentford (loan) 
On 10 August 2007, Pettigrew joined newly relegated League Two club Brentford on a one-month loan, which was later extended for two further months. He was an ever-present in the Bees' opening 11 matches of the season and finished his spell on 11 November, with 14 appearances.

Rotherham United (loan) 
On 31 January 2008, Pettigrew joined League Two club Rotherham United on loan until the end of the 2007–08 season. The financially stricken club went into administration on 18 March and Pettigrew's loan was ended early on 3 April 2008, after he had made just four appearances.

Non-league football 
After rejecting the chance to join Zulte Waregem and trialling with AEK Athens, Pettigrew had short spells in non-League football with Cheshunt, Bishop's Stortford and A.F.C. Sudbury during the 2008–09 season. He later played for Middlesex County League First Division Central & East club West End during the 2011–12 and 2012–13 seasons.

International career 
Pettigrew was capped by England at U16 and U17 level. He was a part of the U17 team which won the 2002 Nordic U17 Championship.

Honours 
England U17
 Nordic U17 Championship: 2002

Career statistics

References

External links

1986 births
Living people
Footballers from the London Borough of Hackney
English footballers
England youth international footballers
Chelsea F.C. players
Wycombe Wanderers F.C. players
Brentford F.C. players
Rotherham United F.C. players
Cheshunt F.C. players
A.F.C. Sudbury players
English Football League players
Isthmian League players
Southern Football League players
National League (English football) players
Bishop's Stortford F.C. players
Association football central defenders
Association football midfielders